Xenodon is a genus of New World snakes in the subfamily Dipsadinae of the family Colubridae.

Geographic range
Species of the genus Xenodon are found in Mexico, Central America, and South America.

Diet
Snakes in the genus Xenodon prey almost exclusively on toads.

Species
The following 12 species are recognized as being valid.
Xenodon dorbignyi 
Xenodon guentheri 
Xenodon histricus 
Xenodon matogrossensis 
Xenodon merremii 
Xenodon nattereri 
Xenodon neuwiedii 
Xenodon pulcher 
Xenodon rabdocephalus 
Xenodon semicinctus 
Xenodon severus 
Xenodon werneri 

Nota bene: A binomial authority in parentheses indicates that the species was originally described in a genus other than Xenodon.

References

Further reading

Boie H (1826). "Notice sur l'Erpétologie de l'île de Java ". Bulletin des Sciences Naturelles et de Géologie 9 (203): 233–240. (Xenodon, new genus, p. 238). (in French).
Freiberg M (1982). Snakes of South America. Hong Kong: T.F.H. Publications. 189 pp. . (Genus Xenodon, p. 113).

Xenodon
Snake genera
Taxa named by Heinrich Boie